Freshwater smelt may refer to:

 Wakasagi smelts, an introduced species of smelt in California, native to eastern Asia. 
Great Lakes smelts, (North American) in the family Osmeridae and genera Allosmerus, Hypomesus, Mallotus, Osmerus, Spirinchus and Thaleichthys
 Whitebait smelts (North American) in the family Osmeridae and genera: Allosmerus, Elongatus, Hypomesus and Mallotus